The R's, (formally The Record's) are a pop/twee band from Brescia, Italy.

History
The R's formed in the summer of 2002 in Brescia and released a series of self-produced recordings. In 2007, they won a music contest sponsored by the newspaper Corriere della Sera. They soon released their first official EP, "Joyful Celebration". The record's single "Move Your Little Fingers" received airplay on national radio stations.

In 2007, The R's released the album "Money's On Fire" with the collaboration of music producer Giovanni Ferrario. A single from the album was featured on a national advertising campaign on MTV Italy.

In 2011, The R's signed with Nat Geo Music, the record label of the National Geographic Society that specializes in contemporary international music.

Discography

Albums 
 Money's On Fire, 2008
 De Flora Et Fauna, 2011

EPs 
 Joyful Celebration, 2007

References

External links
}

Italian pop music groups